Murren may refer to:
Mürren, village in Switzerland
Zürcher Murren, Swiss bread roll
James Murren, president of MGM Mirage, Las Vegas
Heather Murren, member of U.S. Financial Crisis Inquiry Commission 
Murren Karlsson, Swedish footballer